Belas may refer to:

 Belas, Luanda, a municipality in Angola
 , a locality of the Queluz e Belas civil parish in the municipality of Sintra, Portugal
 Belas Rugby Clube, a rugby union club
 Praia de Belas, a neighbourhood in Porto Alegre, Brazil
 the Lombard-language name for Bellagio, Lombardy, Italy